The Men's 800 metre freestyle competition at the 2017 Summer Universiade was held on 23 and 24 August 2017.

Records
Prior to the competition, the existing world and Universiade records were as follows.

The following new records were set during this competition.

Results

Heats 
The heats were held on 23 August at 09:57.

Final 
The final was held on 24 August at 19:02.

References

Men's 800 metre freestyle